Saturday morning pictures were film shows put on in British cinemas between the 1920s and 1970s for children. They were shown on Saturday mornings and the price was normally 6d (2½p). At their peak, nearly 2,000 British cinemas put on a Saturday children’s matinee show, but by 1978 this had dropped to 300.

Films shown included comedy classics, cowboy and adventure films, cartoons, ‘’Zorro’’, ‘’Batman’’ episodes and also films produced by the Children's Film Foundation. The programme often included community singing of songs such as Do-re-mi, with a pointer tracing the lyrics on the screen to help the audience follow. The ABC chain promoted its “Minors Matinees” as providing ‘’Good films, good fun and good fellowship”.

On 5 October 2013 the Cinema Museum in Kennington, London recreated a Saturday Morning Pictures show, with ticket prices between £3 and £5.

See also
 Saturday-morning cartoon

References

Cinemas in the United Kingdom